Applied Geochemistry is an international peer-reviewed academic journal published by the International Association of GeoChemistry covering research on geochemistry and urban geochemistry that was established in 1986. It is published by Elsevier and the editor-in-chief is Michael Kersten. The journal is a hybrid open-access journal, publishing both subscription and open access articles.

References

External links 
 
 

Elsevier academic journals
English-language journals
Geochemistry journals
Publications established in 1986